Kendra Zanotto (born October 30, 1981) is an American competitor in synchronized swimming. Born in Los Gatos, California, she is the oldest child of Daniel and Kimber Zanotto, of Zanotto Markets.

She won an Olympic bronze medal at the 2004 Summer Olympics, in the team competition.

References

1981 births
Living people
Sportspeople from California
Olympic bronze medalists for the United States in synchronized swimming
American synchronized swimmers
Synchronized swimmers at the 2004 Summer Olympics
Medalists at the 2004 Summer Olympics